Hernando Alano (March 20, 1941 – July 23, 2022), better known as Boy Alano, was a Filipino actor. He won the award for Best Child Actor at the 5th Asian Filmfest.

Early life
He was the third child of Consuelo Sotto and Exequiel Alano. He went to Moises Salvador Elementary School and finished high school at National University. He did a year in Far Eastern University and took Commerce. His first dream was to become a businessman.

Career
He first appeared in the 1951 film Roberta and became popular in Kiko. He made about 200 films and television shows since 1950. He was also on the radio show Ricky Romantiko on DZXL every Sunday. His best friends were Victor Wood and Renato del Prado.

Death
Boy Alano died on July 23, 2022 in Sampaloc, Manila at the age of 81.

Filmography

Film

As an actor
1951 – Roberta 
1951 – Anghel ng Pag-ibig 
1952 – Rebecca 
1953 – El Indio 
1953 – Munting Koronel 
1953 – Anak ng Espada 
1953 – Maldita 
1954 – Musikong Bumbong 
1955 – Kuripot 
1956 – Prince Charming 
1957 – Batang Bangkusay 
1958 – The Day of the Trumpet  – Best Child Actor, 5th Asian Filmfest
1964 – Sa Bilis Walang Kaparis
1966 – James Batman
1988 – Kambal Tuko – Boy Unano
1988 – Bobo Cop
1995 – Ang Syota Kong Balikbayan Tino / Tina
1996 – Ikaw ang Mahal Ko
2000 – Juan & Ted: Wanted
2001 – Hindi Sisiw ang Kalaban Mo – Egay
2002 – Lapu-Lapu – Lagum
2003 – A.B. Normal College – Dominic's father
2012 – Of All the Things
2014 – Gangster Lolo

As writer
1991 – Cheeta-eh, Ganda Lalake?

Television
I Heart You Pare – GMA _2011
Untold Stories Mula Sa Face to Face – TV5 _2010
Pidol's Wonderland – TV5 _2010
Pilyang Kerubin – GMA _2010
Jejemom – GMA _2010
Kaya ng Powers – GMA_ 2010
Maynila – GMA _ 2010
Totoy Bato – GMA _ 2009
Show Me Da Manny – _ 2009
May Bukas Pa – ABS-CBN _2009
Joaquin Bordado – GMA _ 2008
Codename: Asero – GMA _ 2008
Ful Haus – GMA 2007-_ 2009
Mga Kuwento ni Lola Basyang – GMA _ 2007
Dalawang Tisoy – RPN _ 2007
Baywalk – QTV _ 2006
Sugo – GMA _ 2005
Mulawin – GMA _ 2005
Noel – QTV _ 2005
Walang Kukurap – GMA _ 2005
Magpakailanman – GMA _ 2002–2008
Back to Iskul Bukol – IBC _ 1998

References

External links

1941 births
2022 deaths
20th-century Filipino male actors
21st-century Filipino male actors
Filipino male child actors
Filipino male television actors